Roderick Gray (22 October 1870 – 27 May 1951) was a New Zealand rugby union player.

Gray was born in Masterton in 1870, and he received his education there. A utility forward, Gray represented Wairarapa at a provincial level, playing 15 games for the team between 1891 and 1897. He played two games for the New Zealand national rugby union team on their 1893 tour of Australia. Initially passed over in the trials, he was called up (together with Billy Watson) as reinforcement, and arrived in time to play the last two games of the tour. He did not appear in any Test matches as New Zealand did not play its first full international until 1903.

Gray worked as a farmer and is said to have been a 'fine miler'. He died on 27 May 1951 at Taratahi in the Wairarapa, and was buried at the Archer Street Cemetery in Masterton.

References

1870 births
1951 deaths
Rugby union players from Masterton
New Zealand rugby union players
New Zealand international rugby union players
Wairarapa rugby union players
Rugby union locks
Burials at Archer Street Cemetery
Rugby union flankers